
Gmina Połaniec is an urban-rural gmina (administrative district) in Staszów County, Świętokrzyskie Voivodeship, in south-central Poland.

Demography 
According to the 2011 Poland census, there were 11,848 people residing in Połaniec Commune, of whom 49.8% were male and 50.2% were female (out of which the population in rural areas amounts to 3,621, of whom 50.4% were male and 49.6% were female). In the commune, the population was spread out, with 19.1% under the age of 18, 40.6% from 18 to 44, 29% from 45 to 64, and 11.2% who were 65 years of age or older (out of which the population in rural areas amounts to 20.4% under the age of 18, 40.1% from 18 to 44, 22.5% from 45 to 64, and 17.0% who were 65 years of age or older).
 Figure 1. Population pyramid of commune in 2010 – by age group and sex
 Figure 2. Population pyramid in rural areas in 2010 – by age group and sex

Villages
Apart from the town of Połaniec, Gmina Połaniec contains the villages and settlements of Brzozowa, Kamieniec, Kraśnik, Łęg, Luszyca, Maśnik, Okrągła, Rudniki, Ruszcza, Ruszcza-Kępa, Rybitwy, Tursko Małe, Tursko Małe-Kolonia, Winnica, Wymysłów, Zawada, Zdzieci Nowe, Zdzieci Stare and Zrębin.

Neighbouring gminas
Gmina Połaniec is bordered by the gminas of Borowa, Gawłuszowice, Łubnice, Osiek and Rytwiany.

References

External links
Polish official population figures 2006

Polaniec
Staszów County